In the mathematical theory of conformal and quasiconformal mappings, the extremal length of a collection of curves  is a measure of the size of  that is invariant under conformal mappings.
The fact that extremal length and conformal modulus are conformal invariants of  makes them useful tools in the study of conformal and quasi-conformal mappings. One also works with extremal length in dimensions greater than two and certain other metric spaces, but the following deals primarily with the two dimensional setting.

Definition of extremal length
To define extremal length, we need to first introduce several related quantities.
Let  be an open set in the complex plane. Suppose that  is a
If 
is Borel-measurable, then for any rectifiable curve  we let

Euclidean element of length. (It is possible that .)
What does this really mean? 
If  is parameterized in some interval ,
then  is the integral of the Borel-measurable function
 with respect to the Borel measure on 
for which the measure of every subinterval  is the length of the
In other words, it is the
Lebesgue-Stieltjes integral 
, where
 is the length of the restriction of 
Also set

If  contains some non-rectifiable curves and
 is defined to be .

Examples

In this section the extremal length is calculated in several examples. The first three of these examples are actually useful in applications of extremal length.

Extremal distance in rectangle
Fix some positive numbers , and let  be the rectangle . Let  be the set of all finite length curves  that cross the rectangle left to right, in the sense that 
(The limits necessarily exist, because we are assuming that  has finite length.) We will now prove that in this case

The opposite inequality is not quite so easy. Consider an arbitrary Borel-measurable  such that
.
For , let  (where we are identifying  with the complex plane).
Then , and hence .
The latter inequality may be written as

Integrating this inequality over  implies
.
Now a change of variable  and an application of the Cauchy–Schwarz inequality give
. This gives .
Therefore, as required.

Therefore, .
It is natural to refer to this as a duality property of extremal length, and a similar duality property occurs in the context of the next subsection.

Extremal distance in annulus
Let  and  be two radii satisfying .

On the other hand,

We conclude that 

We now see that this inequality is really an equality by employing an argument similar to the one given above for the rectangle. Consider an arbitrary Borel-measurable  such that . For  let  denote the curve . Then

Squaring gives

This implies the upper bound .
When combined with the lower bound, this yields the exact value of the extremal length:

Extremal length around an annulus
Using the above methods, it is not hard to show that

This illustrates another instance of extremal length duality.

Extremal length of topologically essential paths in projective plane
In the above examples, the extremal  which maximized the ratio  and gave the extremal length corresponded to a flat metric. In the case of the rectangle, this was just the original metric, but for the annulus, the extremal metric identified is the metric of a cylinder. We now discuss an example where an extremal metric is not flat. In other words, this is the quotient of the sphere by the map . Let  denote the set of closed curves in this projective plane that are not null-homotopic. Then the spherical metric is extremal for this curve family. (The definition of extremal length readily extends to Riemannian surfaces.)

Extremal length of paths containing a point
If  is any collection of paths all of which have positive diameter and containing a point , then . This follows, for example, by taking 

Elementary properties of extremal length
The extremal length satisfies a few simple monotonicity properties. First, it is clear that if , then .
Another sometimes useful inequality is

Set .

Conformal invariance of extremal length
Let  be a conformal homeomorphism
(a bijective holomorphic map) between planar domains. Suppose that
and let  denote the
image curves under . Then .
This conformal invariance statement is the primary reason why the concept of
extremal length is useful.

Here is a proof of conformal invariance. Let  denote the set of curves 
 such that  is rectifiable, and let
, which is the set of rectifiable
Suppose that  is Borel-measurable. Define

A change of variables  gives

Now suppose that  is rectifiable, and set . Formally, we may use a change of variables again:

To justify this formal calculation, suppose that  is defined in some interval , let
Then it is easy to see that , and this implies , as required. The above equalities give,

prove  since we may also apply the above with  replaced by its inverse
It remains to handle the non-rectifiable curves.

Now let  denote the set of rectifiable curves  such that  is
non-rectifiable. We claim that .
Indeed, take , where .
Then a change of variable as above gives

For  and  such that 
.
On the other hand, suppose that  is such that  is unbounded.
Set . Then
 is at least the length of the curve 
Since ,
it follows that .
Thus, indeed, .

Using the results of the previous section, we have
.
We have already seen that . Thus, .
The reverse inequality holds by symmetry, and conformal invariance is therefore established.

Some applications of extremal length 
By the calculation of the extremal distance in an annulus and the conformal
invariance it follows that the annulus  (where )
is not conformally homeomorphic to the annulus  if .

Extremal length in higher dimensions
The notion of extremal length adapts to the study of various problems in dimensions 3 and higher, especially in relation to quasiconformal mappings.

Discrete extremal length
There are two variants of extremal length in this setting. To define the edge extremal length, originally introduced by R. J. Duffin, consider a function . If  is interpreted as a resistor network, where each edge has unit resistance, then the effective resistance between two sets of vertices is precisely the edge extremal length of the collection of paths with one endpoint in one set and the other endpoint in the other set. Thus, discrete extremal length is useful for estimates in discrete potential theory.

Notes

References

Conformal mappings
Potential theory